Mirosław Baszak is a Polish-born Canadian cinematographer. Baszak's work includes Pontypool, Trailer Park Boys: The Movie, Land of the Dead and The Boondock Saints II: All Saints Day.

Baszak was born in Poland, where he acted and worked in theatre. He also studied history and theory at University of Łódź. In early 1980s he emigrated to Germany and then in 1983 to Canada. There he attended Ryerson Polytechnical Institute's film course in 1984. Since then he collaborated on over 30 Canadian and American feature films, as well as many commercials and music videos.

Recognition 
 2008 Genie Award for Best Achievement in Cinematography - Shake Hands with the Devil - Nominee
 1999 Canadian Society of Cinematographers CSC Award for Best Cinematography in a TV series - Rescuers: Stories of Courage: Two Families - Nominated

References

External links 
 
 
 Kodak Canada biography

Year of birth missing (living people)
Living people
Canadian cinematographers
Polish emigrants to Canada
Toronto Metropolitan University alumni
Baszak
Place of birth missing (living people)